Jesse Everett Hughes (born September 24, 1972) is an American singer and musician. He is best known as the frontman of the rock band Eagles of Death Metal, with whom he has recorded four studio albums and a live album. Hughes is also known for his solo career under the moniker Boots Electric.

Early life
Jesse Everett Hughes was born in Greenville, South Carolina, on September 24, 1972. At age seven, he moved with his mother Jo Ellen to Palm Desert, California. In high school, he met Josh Homme, and they became good friends after Homme stopped a bully from picking on Hughes. He graduated from Greenville Technical College with a degree in journalism and worked as the manager of a video depot in Palm Desert for several years.

Career

Eagles of Death Metal
Hughes and Homme formed Eagles of Death Metal in 1998. Hughes credits Homme with saving his life, claiming that during the recording of the second Eagles of Death Metal album Death By Sexy, he fell into serious drug addiction and that Homme not only drove him to rehabilitation, but paid for it as well.

On November 13, 2015, Le Bataclan theatre in Paris was attacked by terrorists while Eagles of Death Metal were performing. The band escaped via the backstage area, but their merchandise manager Nick Alexander was killed. The attacks killed 90 fans at the theatre.  Other related attacks occurred in Paris at restaurant terraces that night, for a total of 130 deaths in all, including the Bataclan murders and 1 person killed at the Stade de France in a preliminary attack.

Other projects
Hughes is one of the characters in the book Sex Tips from Rock Stars by Paul Miles published by Omnibus Press in July 2010.

In September 2011, Hughes released Honkey Kong, his first solo album under the nickname Boots Electric. It was released on Dangerbird Records.

In 2015, Hughes appeared in the Björn Tagemose-directed silent film Gutterdämmerung alongside Iggy Pop, Grace Jones, Lemmy, and Henry Rollins.

In 2017, Hughes starred in the Colin Hanks directed documentary Eagles of Death Metal: Nos Amis (Our Friends) about the November 13, 2015, terrorist attack in Paris that claimed 89 lives at the Eagles of Death Metal's Bataclan Theatre concert. The documentary also features Josh Homme and Bono.

In 2020, MUSE TV and Culturally Obsessed announced Hughes as their Senior Reporter.

In 2021, Memphis musician Muck Sticky and Hughes collaborated and released a song and music video, Stir Crazy.

In 2021, Eagles of Death Metal announced their 24th anniversary tour.

Musical equipment

Hughes is currently endorsed by Maton guitars and Orange amplifiers.

Guitars
 Maton MS500 Electric
 Maton BB1200 Electric
 Maton EAJ85 Jumbo Acoustic
 Yamaha AES1500
 Custom Gretsch Duo Jet

Effects
 Ernie Ball Wah Pedal
 Boss DD-6 Delay
 TC Electronic Nova Drive Overdrive/Distortion
 Boss TU-2 Tuner
 EHX Mini Q Tron
 EHX Deluxe Memory Man Classic Chassis
 MOOG MF-102 Moogerfooger Ring Modulator
 MXR Phase 100
 Boss BF-3 Flanger
 Ibanez TS808 Tube Screamer
 Vox V8474 Wah
 Custom L.A. Sound Design Pedalboard

Amplifiers
 Orange Rockerverb 50w combo
 Orange 4x12 Cabinet
 Laney Amplifier

Personal life 
Hughes is divorced and has a son named Micah.

Hughes is currently in a relationship with his long-time girlfriend, bass player Tuesday Cross.

Hughes uses many different nicknames, including "J. Devil", "The Devil", "Boots Electric", and "Fabulous Weapon" (the latter two being band names used by his father). In November 2008, he revealed that his bandmate Josh Homme gave him "The Devil" nickname when he was 13: "I used to get picked on a lot, and when I would get picked on severely, or if it really made a point to me, I would get vengeance, but I would get vengeance in the way that I could, which was mostly clever and all consuming. Joshua once witnessed me in the moment I was about to enact vengeance upon someone, and he just said, 'You're the fucking devil dude,' and it stuck."

In a November 2008 interview, Homme described himself and Hughes as "socially liberal but government conservative guys". Hughes' political views became more right-wing over the following years, and he revealed in December 2013 that he had even "wanted to be a Republican politician" in his youth. He has described himself as a "proud Zionist".

Controversies

In October 2015, the documentary The Redemption of the Devil gave a behind-the-scenes look at Hughes' life. While generally well-received, the documentary mostly gained attention for Hughes' erratic behavior, which included beginning a relationship with a former porn actress and getting ordained as a minister with the Universal Life Church.

In February 2016, Hughes made a series of controversial statements blaming Islam, liberal values, and French gun control laws for the November 2015 Bataclan attack, as well as claiming that Muslims "[celebrated] in the streets" during the attack. He also speculated that it was an inside job, claiming that security personnel who did not report to the venue that day "had a reason not to show up". He and his band were then dropped from the lineup of two French music festivals. Bataclan management said that Hughes and his manager were refused entry to the venue when he tried to visit on the anniversary of the attack. This has been denied by the band's manager Marc Pollack as well as journalists that were at the event.

In January 2017, Hughes' former friend Andrew Julian Vega obtained a restraining order against Hughes after he sent Vega death threats.

In March 2018, Hughes attacked the March for Our Lives protesters on Instagram, calling them "pathetic" and "disgusting vile abusers of the dead". He accused the survivors of the Stoneman Douglas High School shooting who participated in the protest of "exploiting the death of 16 of our fellow students for a few Facebook likes and some media attention" while accusing one of them, X González, of treason. He later deleted the posts amidst widespread criticism and apologized five days later, saying, "I was not attempting to impugn the youth of America and this beautiful thing that they accomplished. I truly am sorry, I did not mean to hurt anyone or cause any harm."

Discography

Filmography

References

External links

Official Eagles of Death Metal site
Jesse talks to Mattias and Dave-Os of Band of the Day
Jesse Hughes Talks About Heart On
Jesse Hughes In SPIN's November Issue 
Boots Electric tribute Movember team

1972 births
Living people
American rock singers
American rock guitarists
Musicians from Greenville, South Carolina
Singers from South Carolina
South Carolina Republicans
Survivors of terrorist attacks
November 2015 Paris attacks
20th-century American singers
21st-century American singers
American male guitarists
20th-century American guitarists
21st-century American guitarists
Guitarists from South Carolina
Eagles of Death Metal members
20th-century American male singers
21st-century American male singers